Tao Geoghegan Hart (born 30 March 1995) is a British cyclist who currently rides for UCI WorldTeam . 
He won the 2020 Giro d'Italia, taking the jersey following the final day time-trial.

Early and personal life
Geoghegan Hart was born in Holloway, London. The eldest of 4 siblings, he grew up in the London Fields neighbourhood of Hackney, attending Gayhurst primary school.
His family is of Scottish and Irish ancestry. The name Tao is the Irish version of his father's forename Tom. He played football until he was 12 and was a goalkeeper. He was brought up as a vegetarian. He also became a keen swimmer after starting secondary school at Stoke Newington School; on 28 July 2008, when he was 13, he was part of a cross-Channel swimming relay with Clissold Swimming Club. The team of six completed the crossing in 11 hours 34 minutes. 

Geoghegan Hart learnt to ride a bike when he was five, and first had a BMX cycle as a young boy. He has said he recalls being impressed when attending the 2007 Tour de France prologue in London as a spectator. He gained a serious interest in cycling after his father bought him a second-hand women's Specialized Dolce when he was 13. He took part in the Dunwich Dynamo cycle ride in the summer of 2008. In 2009, Tao attended the launch of Team Sky, joining an amateur peloton riding behind Bradley Wiggins and Chris Froome. He also took a Saturday job at Condor Cycles that year, and was supported with bicycles, wheels, and kit by the London bicycle manufacturer. He was also sponsored by London company Rapha as a young rider.

Geoghegan Hart is currently in a relationship with Carlotte Wubben-Moy - a football player who also grew up in East London and like Geoghegan Hart, attended Stoke Newington School.

Career

Geoghegan Hart started competitive racing at the national level in 2010 with the East London-based club Cycling Club Hackney. He joined the British Cycling under-16 development programme in 2011, followed by the Olympic Development Programme for under-18s. He also competed internationally, and attracted attention for victories abroad and podium places at races including 3rd place at the 2013 Paris–Roubaix Juniors. He also took a clean sweep of mountains, points and general classification jerseys at the Giro Internazionale della Lunigiana in 2013.

In 2014, Geoghegan Hart rode for Axel Merckx's . He finished third in Liège–Bastogne–Liège U23 and rode his first UCI 2. HC ranked race at the Tour of California in May 2014 before completing a second at the Tour of Britain in September when, riding for the Great Britain national team, he finished 15th overall.

In 2015, he again finished third in Liège–Bastogne–Liège U23, eighth overall in the Tour of the Gila, 13th overall in the Tour of California and seventh overall in the USA Pro Cycling Challenge, winning the best young rider classification.

In August 2018, he was named in the startlist for the 2018 Vuelta a España. In May 2019, he was named in the startlist for the 2019 Giro d'Italia.

On 18 October 2020, Geoghegan Hart won his first stage of a Grand Tour, taking stage 15 of the Giro d'Italia on the Alpine summit finish of the Piancavallo. Following in the steps of previous winners Marco Pantani and Mikel Landa, Geoghegan Hart rode away from the remaining peloton with the Sunweb duo of Jai Hindley and Wilco Kelderman, out-sprinting Kelderman at the line to take the stage win. The result also took Geoghegan Hart up to 4th in the General Classification of the race ahead of the second rest day.
On 24 October 2020, he won his second stage of the Giro d'Italia, taking 2nd overall on the same time as the leader, and on the final stage on the following day, he finished 13th in a time-trial in a time which won the Giro d'Italia.
In taking the jersey following the final day time-trial, he became the first rider in Giro history to win the overall title having never carried the pink jersey during the race itself.

Geoghegan Hart had a few tough seasons after his Giro d'Italia win in 2020 having to deal with COVID and repeated infections afterwards. He finished 60th on GC in the 2021 Tour de France and notched only 19th in the 2022 Vuelta a España. He returned to form in early 2023 after winning the 4th stage of the Volta a la Comunitat Valenciana, his first win in over 2 years after the Giro victory. He finished 3rd on GC and continued on upward trajectory by securing a 3rd place on GC in the 2023 Tirreno–Adriatico in March 2023.

Major results

2012
 3rd Overall National Junior Road Series
2013
 1st  Overall Giro della Lunigiana
1st  Points classification
1st  Mountains classification
1st Stage 1
 1st  Overall Tour of Istria
1st Stage 2
 3rd Paris–Roubaix Juniors
 3rd Road race, National Junior Road Championships
 5th Overall Course de la Paix Juniors
2014
 3rd Liège–Bastogne–Liège Espoirs
 10th Overall Tour de l'Avenir
2015
 3rd Time trial, National Under-23 Road Championships
 3rd Liège–Bastogne–Liège Espoirs
 6th Trofeo PIVA
 7th Overall USA Pro Cycling Challenge
1st  Young rider classification
 8th Overall Tour of the Gila
 9th Beaumont Trophy
2016
 National Under-23 Road Championships
1st  Road race
2nd Time trial
 1st Trofeo PIVA
 2nd Overall Tour de Savoie Mont-Blanc
1st Stage 5
 2nd Overall Course de la Paix Under-23
 6th Overall Tour of the Gila
1st  Young rider classification
 6th Overall Tour de l'Avenir
 6th Overall Volta ao Alentejo
 7th Gran Premio Palio del Recioto
 8th Giro del Belvedere
 9th Time trial, UEC European Under-23 Road Championships
 10th Ruota d'Oro
2017
 2nd Road race, National Under-23 Road Championships
 4th Time trial, National Road Championships
 4th Trofeo Serra de Tramuntana
 8th Overall Tour of California
 8th Overall Tour of Yorkshire
2018
 1st Stage 3 (TTT) Critérium du Dauphiné
 5th Overall Tour of California
 5th Overall Vuelta a Burgos
2019
 2nd Overall Tour of the Alps
1st Stages 1 & 4
 5th Overall Tour de Pologne
 8th Tre Valli Varesine
  Combativity award Stage 20 Vuelta a España
2020
 1st  Overall Giro d'Italia
1st  Young rider classification
1st Stages 15 & 20
 3rd Overall Volta a la Comunitat Valenciana
2021
 9th Memorial Marco Pantani
 10th Overall Critérium du Dauphiné
 10th Overall Tour des Alpes-Maritimes et du Var
2022
 5th Overall Tour of Norway
 8th Overall Critérium du Dauphiné
2023
 3rd Overall Tirreno–Adriatico
 3rd Overall Volta a la Comunitat Valenciana
1st Stage 4
 6th Overall Vuelta a Andalucía

General classification results timeline

References

External links

 
 Tao Geoghegan Hart at Team Axeon Hagens Berman
 
 
 
 
 
 
 
 

1995 births
Living people
British male cyclists
Giro d'Italia winners
British Giro d'Italia stage winners
Cyclists from Greater London
English people of Irish descent
English people of Scottish descent
Olympic cyclists of Great Britain
Cyclists at the 2020 Summer Olympics
People from Hackney, London